Mount Rushmore National Memorial, also referred to as the Shrine of Democracy, is a national memorial centered on a colossal sculpture carved into the granite face of Mount Rushmore (Lakota: Tȟuŋkášila Šákpe, or Six Grandfathers) in the Black Hills near Keystone, South Dakota, United States. Sculptor Gutzon Borglum designed the sculpture and oversaw the project's execution from 1927 to 1941 with the help of his son, Lincoln Borglum. The sculpture features the  heads of four United States presidents: George Washington (1732–1799), Thomas Jefferson (1743–1826), Theodore Roosevelt (1858–1919) and Abraham Lincoln (1809–1865). Mount Rushmore attracts more than two million visitors annually. The four presidents were chosen to represent the nation's birth, growth, development and preservation, respectively.

The sculptor chose Mount Rushmore in part because it faces southeast for maximum sun exposure. The carving was the idea of Doane Robinson, a historian for the state of South Dakota. Robinson originally wanted the sculpture to feature American West heroes, such as Lewis and Clark, their expedition guide Sacagawea, Oglala Lakota chief Red Cloud,<ref>'!, episode 5x08 "Mount Rushmore", May 10, 2007</ref> Buffalo Bill Cody, and Oglala Lakota chief Crazy Horse. Borglum believed that the sculpture should have broader appeal and chose the four presidents.

Peter Norbeck, U.S. senator from South Dakota, sponsored the project and secured federal funding. Construction began in 1927 and the presidents' faces were completed between 1934 and 1939. After Gutzon Borglum died in March 1941, his son Lincoln took over as leader of the construction project. Each president was originally to be depicted from head to waist, but lack of funding forced construction to end on October 31, 1941.

The sculpture at Mount Rushmore is built on land that was illegally taken from the Sioux Nation in the 1870s. The Sioux continue to demand return of the land, and in 1980 the US Supreme Court ruled in United States v. Sioux Nation of Indians that the Black Hills were stolen and awarded $102 million in compensation. The Sioux have refused the money and demanded return of the land. This conflict continues into the present day.

 History 

 "Six Grandfathers" to "Mount Rushmore" 
Mount Rushmore and the surrounding Black Hills (Pahá Sápa) are considered sacred by Plains Indians such as the Arapaho, Cheyenne, and Lakota Sioux, who used the area for centuries as a place to pray and gather food, building materials, and medicine.
The Lakota called the mountain "Six Grandfathers" (Tȟuŋkášila Šákpe), symbolizing ancestral deities personified as the six directions: north, south, east, west, above (sky), and below (earth).
In the latter half of the 19th century, expansion by the United States into the Black Hills led to the Sioux Wars. In the 1868 Treaty of Fort Laramie, the U.S. government granted exclusive use of all of the Black Hills, including Six Grandfathers, to the Sioux in perpetuity.

Six Grandfathers was a significant part of the spiritual journey taken in the early 1870s by Lakota leader Black Elk (Heȟáka Sápa, also known as "The Sixth Grandfather"), that culminated at the nearby Black Elk Peak, (Hiŋháŋ Káǧa, "Making of Owls")
U.S. general George Armstrong Custer summited Black Elk Peak a few years later in 1874 during the Black Hills Expedition, which triggered the Black Hills Gold Rush and Great Sioux War of 1876.
In 1877, the U.S. broke the Treaty of Fort Laramie and asserted control over the area, leading to an influx of settlers and prospectors.

Among those prospectors was New York mining promoter James Wilson, who organized the Harney Peak Tin Company, and hired New York attorney Charles E. Rushmore to visit the Black Hills and confirm the company's land claims. During a visit in 1884 or 1885, 
Rushmore saw Six Grandfathers and asked his guide, Bill Challis, the mountain's name; Challis replied that the mountain didn't have a name, but that it would henceforth be named after Rushmore.
The name "Mount Rushmore" continued to be used locally, and was officially recognized by the United States Board of Geographic Names in June 1930.

 Concept, design and funding 

By the 1920s, South Dakota had become a U.S. state, and was a popular destination for road trippers visiting the Black Hills National Forest, Wind Cave National Park, and Needles Highway.
In 1923, the Secretary of the South Dakota State Historical Society, Doane Robinson, who would come to be known as the "Father of Mount Rushmore", learned about the "Shrine to the Confederacy", a project to carve the likenesses of Confederate generals into the side of Stone Mountain, Georgia that had been underway since 1915.
Seeking to boost tourism to South Dakota, Robinson began promoting the idea of a similar monument in the Black Hills, representing "not only the wild grandeur of its local geography but also the triumph of western civilization over that geography through its anthropomorphic representation."

Robinson initially approached sculptor Lorado Taft, but Taft was ill at the time and uninterested in Robinson's project. Robinson next sought the help of then-U.S. Senator Peter Norbeck, who had established Custer State Park when he was Governor in 1919. Norbeck cautiously supported Robinson's plan, and Robinson began campaigning for it publicly. Some in the local community also supported Robinson's plan, but many opposed it vigorously.

On August 20, 1924, Robinson wrote to Gutzon Borglum, the sculptor of "Shrine to the Confederacy," asking him to travel to the Black Hills region to determine whether the carving could be accomplished.
Borglum, who had involved himself with the Ku Klux Klan, one of the Stone Mountain memorial's funders, had been having disagreements with the Stone Mountain Memorial Association, and on September 24, 1924, travelled to South Dakota to meet Robinson.

Borglum's original plan was to make the carvings in 150-meter-high granite pillars known as the Needles (Hiŋháŋ Káǧa). However, the eroded Needles were too thin to support sculpting.
On August 14, 1925, Borglum summitted Black Elk Peak while scouting alternative locations, and reportedly said upon seeing Mount Rushmore, "America will march along that skyline." He chose Mount Rushmore, a grander location, partly because it faced southeast and enjoyed maximum exposure to the sun.

Borglum rejected Robinson's original plan of depicting characters from the Old West, such as Lewis and Clark, Red Cloud, Sacagawea, John C. Fremont, and Crazy Horse, and instead decided to depict four American presidents: George Washington, Thomas Jefferson, Abraham Lincoln, and Theodore Roosevelt.
The four presidential faces were said to be carved into the granite with the intention of symbolizing "an accomplishment born, planned, and created in the minds and by the hands of Americans for Americans". 
The Lakota and other local indigenous communities objected to the overall plan as constituting desecration of their sacred lands, and to the racist and sometimes violent anti-indigenous policies of the four presidents depicted.
For the Lakota and other tribes, the monument "came to epitomize the loss of their sacred lands and the injustices they've suffered under the U.S. government."

Senator Norbeck and Congressman William Williamson of South Dakota introduced bills in early 1925 for permission to use federal land, which passed easily. South Dakota legislation had less support, only passing narrowly on its third attempt, which Governor Carl Gunderson signed into law on March 5, 1925. Private funding came slowly and Borglum invited President Calvin Coolidge to an August 1927 dedication ceremony, at which he promised federal funding. Congress passed the Mount Rushmore National Memorial Act, signed by Coolidge, which authorized up to $250,000 in matching funds. The 1929 presidential transition to Herbert Hoover delayed funding until an initial federal match of $54,670.56 was acquired.

Carving started in 1927 and ended in 1941 with no fatalities.Mount Rushmore National Memorial. Outdoorplaces.com. Retrieved June 7, 2006.

 Construction 

Between October 4, 1927, and October 31, 1941, Gutzon Borglum and 400 workers sculpted the colossal  carvings of United States Presidents George Washington, Thomas Jefferson, Theodore Roosevelt, and Abraham Lincoln to represent the first 150 years of American history. These presidents were selected by Borglum because of their role in preserving the Republic and expanding its territory. The carving of Mount Rushmore involved the use of dynamite, followed by the process of "honeycombing", where workers drill holes close together, allowing small pieces to be removed by hand. The image of Thomas Jefferson was originally intended to appear in the area at Washington's right, but after the work there was begun, the rock was found to be unsuitable, so the work on Jefferson's figure was dynamited, and a new figure was sculpted to Washington's left.

The chief carver of the mountain was Luigi Del Bianco, an artisan and stonemason who emigrated to the U.S. from Friuli in Italy and was chosen to work on this project because of his understanding of sculptural language and ability to imbue emotion in the carved portraits.

In 1933, the National Park Service took Mount Rushmore under its jurisdiction. Julian Spotts helped with the project by improving its infrastructure. For example, he had the tram upgraded so it could reach the top of Mount Rushmore for the ease of workers. By July 4, 1934, Washington's face had been completed and was dedicated. The face of Thomas Jefferson was dedicated in 1936, and Abraham Lincoln's on September 17, 1937. In 1937, a bill was introduced in Congress to add the head of civil-rights leader Susan B. Anthony, but a rider was passed on an appropriations bill requiring federal funds be used to finish only those heads that had already been started at that time. In 1939, the face of Theodore Roosevelt was dedicated.

The Sculptor's Studio – a display of unique plaster models and tools related to the sculpting – was built in 1939 under the direction of Borglum. Borglum died from an embolism in March 1941. His son, Lincoln Borglum, continued the project. Originally, it was planned that the figures would be carved from head to waist, but insufficient funding forced the carving to end. Borglum had also planned a massive panel in the shape of the Louisiana Purchase commemorating in eight-foot-tall gilded letters the Declaration of Independence, U.S. Constitution, Louisiana Purchase, and seven other territorial acquisitions from the Alaska purchase to the Panama Canal Zone. In total, the entire project cost US$989,992.32 (equivalent to $ in ).

Nick Clifford, the last remaining carver, died in November 2019 at age 98.

 Visitor center 
Harold Spitznagel and Cecil Doty designed the original visitor center, finished in 1957, as part of the Mission 66 effort to improve visitors' facilities at national parks and monuments across the country. Ten years of redevelopment work culminated with the completion of extensive visitor facilities and sidewalks in 1998, such as a Visitor Center, the Lincoln Borglum Museum, and the Presidential Trail.

On October 15, 1966, Mount Rushmore was listed on the National Register of Historic Places. A 500-word essay giving the history of the United States by Nebraska student William Andrew Burkett was selected as the college-age group winner in a 1934 competition, and that essay was placed on the Entablature on a bronze plate in 1973. In 1991, President George H. W. Bush officially dedicated Mount Rushmore.
Proposals to add additional faces
In 1937, when the sculpture was not yet complete, a bill in Congress supporting the addition of women's rights activist Susan B. Anthony failed. When the sculpture was completed in 1941, the sculptors said that the remaining rock was not suitable for additional carvings. This stance was shared by RESPEC, an engineering firm charged with monitoring the stability of the rock in 1989. However, proposals of additional sculptures have been made regardless. These include John F. Kennedy after his assassination in 1963, and Ronald Reagan in 1985 and 1999 – the latter proposal receiving a debate in Congress at the time. Barack Obama was asked about his own potential addition in 2008 and he joked that his ears were too large.

Donald Trump has on occasion expressed interest in his own addition to the mountain. During a 2017 rally in Ohio, he said "I'd ask whether or not you some day think I will be on Mount Rushmore. If I did it joking – totally joking, having fun – the fake news media will say, ‘He believes he should be on Mount Rushmore.’ So I won't say it.” South Dakota Governor Kristi Noem, described the potential addition as Trump's "dream" in 2018.

 Tourism 

Tourism is South Dakota's second-largest industry, and Mount Rushmore is the state's top tourist attraction. 2,185,447 people visited the park in 2012.

The popularity of the location, as with many other national monuments, derives from its immediate recognizability; "there are no substitutes for iconic resources such as the Statue of Liberty, the Lincoln Memorial, or Mount Rushmore. These locations are one of a kind places". However, Mount Rushmore also provides access to a surrounding environment of wilderness, which distinguishes it from the typical proximity of national monuments to urban centers like Washington, D.C., and New York City.

In the 1950s and 1960s, local Lakota Sioux elder Benjamin Black Elk (son of medicine man Black Elk, who had been present at the Battle of the Little Bighorn) was known as the "Fifth Face of Mount Rushmore", posing for photographs with thousands of tourists daily in his native attire. The South Dakota State Historical Society notes that he was one of the most photographed people in the world over that 20-year period.

 Hall of Records 

Borglum originally envisioned a grand Hall of Records where America's greatest historical documents and artifacts could be protected and shown to tourists. He managed to start the project, but cut only 70 feet (21 m) into the rock before work stopped in 1939 to focus on the faces. In 1998, a repository was constructed inside the mouth of the cave housing 16 enamel panels with biographical and historical information about Mount Rushmore as well as the texts of the documents Borglum wanted to preserve there. The repository consists of a teakwood box inside of a titanium vault placed in the ground with a granite capstone.

 Conservation 
The ongoing conservation of the site is overseen by the National Park Service. Maintenance of the memorial requires mountain climbers to monitor and seal cracks annually. Due to budget constraints, the memorial is not regularly cleaned to remove lichens. Other efforts to conserve the monument have included replacement of the sealant applied originally to cracks in the stone by Gutzon Borglum, which had proved ineffective at providing water resistance. The components of Borglum's sealant included linseed oil, granite dust, and white lead, but a modern silicone replacement for the cracks is now used, disguised with granite dust.

In 1998, electronic monitoring devices were installed to track movement in the topology of the sculpture to an accuracy of three millimeters. The site was digitally recorded in 2009 using a terrestrial laser scanning method as part of the international Scottish Ten project, providing a high-resolution record to aid the conservation of the site. This data was made publicly accessible online.

 Ecology 

The flora and fauna of Mount Rushmore are similar to those of the rest of the Black Hills region of South Dakota. Birds including the turkey vulture, golden eagle, bald eagle, red-tailed hawk, swallows and white-throated swifts fly around Mount Rushmore and nest in the ledges of the mountain. Smaller birds, including songbirds, nuthatches, woodpeckers and flycatchers inhabit the surrounding pine forests. Terrestrial mammals include the mouse, least chipmunk, red squirrel, skunk, porcupine, raccoon, beaver, badger, coyote, bighorn sheep, bobcat, elk, mule deer, yellow-bellied marmot, and American bison. The striped chorus frog, western chorus frog, and northern leopard frog also inhabit the area, along with several species of snake. Grizzly Bear Brook and Starling Basin Brook, the two streams in the memorial, support fish such as the longnose dace and the brook trout. Mountain goats are not indigenous to the region. Those living near Mount Rushmore are descendants of a tribe that Canada gifted to Custer State Park in 1924, which later escaped.

At lower elevations, coniferous trees, mainly the ponderosa pine, surround most of the monument. Other trees include the bur oak, the Black Hills spruce, and the cottonwood. Nine species of shrubs grow near Mount Rushmore. There is also a wide variety of wildflowers, including especially the snapdragon, sunflower, and violet. Towards higher elevations, plant life becomes sparser. However, only approximately five percent of the plant species found in the Black Hills are indigenous to the region.

Trees and other plants help to control surface runoff. Dikes, seeps, and springs help to dam up water that is flowing downhill, providing watering spots for animals. In addition, stones like sandstone and limestone help to hold groundwater, creating aquifers.

A 2016 investigation by the U.S. Geological Survey found unusually high concentrations of perchlorate in the surface water and groundwater of the area. A sample collected from a stream had a maximum perchlorate concentration of 54 micrograms per liter, roughly 270 times higher than samples taken from locations outside the area. The report concluded the probable cause of the contamination was the aerial fireworks displays that had taken place on Independence Days from 1998 to 2009. The National Park Service also reported that at least 27 forest fires around Mount Rushmore in that same period (1998 to 2009) have been caused by fireworks displays.

A study of the fire scars present in tree ring samples indicates that forest fires occur in the ponderosa forests surrounding Mount Rushmore around every 27 years. Large fires are not common. Most events have been ground fires that serve to clear forest debris. The area is a climax community. Recent  pine beetle infestations have threatened the forest.

 Geography 

 Geology 
Mount Rushmore is largely composed of granite. The memorial is carved on the northwest margin of the Black Elk Peak granite batholith in the Black Hills of South Dakota, so the geologic formations of the heart of the Black Hills region are also evident at Mount Rushmore. The batholith magma intruded into the pre-existing mica schist rocks during the Proterozoic, 1.6 billion years ago. Coarse grained pegmatite dikes are associated with the granite intrusion of Black Elk Peak and are visibly lighter in color, thus explaining the light-colored streaks on the foreheads of the presidents.

The Black Hills granites were exposed to erosion during the Neoproterozoic, but were later buried by sandstone and other sediments during the Cambrian. Remaining buried throughout the Paleozoic, they were re-exposed again during the Laramide orogeny around 70 million years ago. The Black Hills area was uplifted as an elongated geologic dome. Subsequent erosion stripped the granite of the overlying sediments and the softer adjacent schist. Some schist does remain and can be seen as the darker material just below the sculpture of Washington.

The tallest mountain in the region is Black Elk Peak. Borglum selected Mount Rushmore as the site for several reasons. The rock of the mountain is composed of smooth, fine-grained granite. The durable granite erodes only  every 10,000 years, thus was more than sturdy enough to support the sculpture and its long-term exposure.

It is not possible to add another president to the memorial, because the rock that surrounds the existing faces is not suitable for additional carving, and because additional sculpting could create instabilities in the existing carvings.

 Soils 
The Mount Rushmore area is underlain by well drained alfisol soils of very gravelly loam (Mocmount) to silt loam (Buska) texture, brown to dark grayish brown.

 Climate 
Mount Rushmore has a dry-winter humid continental climate (Dwb in the Köppen climate classification).

The two wettest months of the year are May and June. Orographic lift causes brief but strong afternoon thunderstorms during the summer.

 In popular culture 

Mount Rushmore has been depicted in multiple films, comic books, and television series. Its functions vary from settings for action scenes to the site of hidden locations. Its most famous appearance is as the location of the final chase scene in the 1959 film North by Northwest. It is used as a secret base of operations by the protagonists in the 2004 film Team America: World Police, and the secret underground city of Cíbola is located there in the 2007 film National Treasure: Book of Secrets. In some films, the presidential faces are replaced with others; examples include the 1980 film Superman II and the 1996 film Mars Attacks! where the villains add their faces to the monument, and the 2003 film Head of State where the newly elected president's face is added. In works showing attacks on landmarks to signify the scope of a threat, Mount Rushmore is a common target; examples include the aforementioned facial replacements in Superman II and Mars Attacks! as well as natural disasters in works like the 2006 miniseries 10.5: Apocalypse and terrorist attacks as in the 1997 film The Peacekeeper. An atypical representation of the monument appears in the 2013 film Nebraska, where instead of being treated with reverence it is criticized for being unfinished.Walter Metz, "Review: Nebraska. Dir. Alexander Payne. Paramount Vantage, 2013". Middle West Review Volume 1, Number 1, (University of Nebraska Press, Fall 2014), p. 154–55.

 Controversies 

The Treaty of Fort Laramie (1868) had granted the Black Hills to the Lakota people in perpetuity, but the United States took the area from the tribe after the Great Sioux War of 1876. Members of the American Indian Movement led an occupation of the monument in 1971, naming it "Mount Crazy Horse", and Lakota holy man John Fire Lame Deer planted a prayer staff on top of the mountain. Lame Deer said that the staff formed a symbolic shroud over the presidents' faces "which shall remain dirty until the treaties concerning the Black Hills are fulfilled."

The 1980 United States Supreme Court decision United States v. Sioux Nation of Indians ruled that the Sioux had not received just compensation for their land in the Black Hills, which includes Mount Rushmore. The court proposed $102 million as compensation for the loss of the Black Hills. This compensation was valued at $1.3 billion in 2011, and – with accumulated interest – nearly $2 billion in 2021. In 2020, Oglala Lakota Nation citizen and Indigenous activist Nick Tilsen explained that his people would not accept a settlement, "because we won't settle for anything less than the full return of our lands as stipulated by the treaties our nations signed and agreed upon."

On July 3, 2020, scores of activists demonstrated when President Donald Trump held a campaign rally at Mount Rushmore. The foremost message was that Indigenous people want their land back, pursuant to the ongoing dispute of the Black Hills land claim. Twenty people were arrested.

Construction on the Crazy Horse Memorial began in 1940 elsewhere in the Black Hills. Ostensibly to commemorate the Native American leader and as a response to Mount Rushmore, if completed it would be larger than Mount Rushmore. The Crazy Horse Memorial Foundation has rejected offers of federal funds. Its construction has the support of some Lakota chiefs, but it is the subject of controversy, even among Native American tribes.

In 2004, Gerard Baker was appointed superintendent of the park, the first and so far only Native American in that role. Baker stated that he will open up more "avenues of interpretation", and that the four presidents are "only one avenue and only one focus."

 Legacy and commemoration 

On August 11, 1952, the U.S. Post Office issued the Mount Rushmore Memorial 3-cent commemorative stamp on the 25th anniversary of the dedication of the Mount Rushmore National Memorial. On January 2, 1974, a 26-cent airmail stamp depicting the monument was also issued. In 1991 the United States Mint released commemorative silver dollar, half-dollar, and five-dollar coins celebrating the 50th anniversary of the monument's dedication,  and the sculpture was the main subject of the 2006 South Dakota state quarter.

In music, American composer Michael Daugherty's 2010 piece for chorus and orchestra, "Mount Rushmore," depicts each of the four presidents in separate movements. The piece sets texts by George Washington, William Billings, Thomas Jefferson, Maria Cosway, Theodore Roosevelt, and Abraham Lincoln. By contrast, the song, "Little Snakes", by Protest The Hero, "addresses the violent colonial history involved in the sculpting of Mount Rushmore", critiquing the monument as a symbol of colonialism, referencing the genocide of indigenous peoples and the ownership of slaves by George Washington and Thomas Jefferson.

The Washington Nationals baseball club uses large foam rubber depictions of the "Rushmore Four" in both their marketing campaigns and in a series of in-stadium promotions such as the Presidents Race.

 See also 
 List of colossal sculpture in situ
 List of tallest statues
 List of national memorials of the United States
 List of statues of George Washington
 List of statues of Thomas Jefferson
 List of statues of Abraham Lincoln
 List of sculptures of presidents of the United States
 Crazy Horse Memorial, another large sculpture in the Black Hills
 Atatürk Mask, another large relief sculpture
 Presidential memorials in the United States

 References 

Further reading
 
 
 Coutant, Arnaud (2014). Les Visages de l'Amérique, les constructeurs d'une démocratie fédérale. Mare et Martin. French study about the Four Presidents, Life, presidency, influence about American political evolution. (Archived link)
 
 
 Larner, Jesse (2002). Mount Rushmore: An Icon Reconsidered. New York: Nation Books.
 Taliaferro, John (2002). Great White Fathers: The Story of the Obsessive Quest to Create Mount Rushmore. New York: PublicAffairs.  .
 The National Parks: Index 2001–2003''. Washington, D.C.: United States Department of the Interior. .

External links 

 
National Memorials of the United States
Black Hills
Landforms of Pennington County, South Dakota
Monuments and memorials in South Dakota
National Park Service areas in South Dakota
Outdoor sculptures in South Dakota
Protected areas of Pennington County, South Dakota
Rushmore
Buildings and monuments honoring American presidents in the United States
Granite sculptures in South Dakota
Rock formations of South Dakota
Symbols of South Dakota
Monuments and memorials to Abraham Lincoln in the United States
Monuments and memorials to George Washington in the United States
Statues of Abraham Lincoln
Statues of George Washington
Cultural depictions of Abraham Lincoln
Statues of Theodore Roosevelt
Cultural depictions of Thomas Jefferson
Great Sioux War of 1876
1941 sculptures
Mountain monuments and memorials
Monuments and memorials on the National Register of Historic Places in South Dakota
Sculptures in South Dakota
Sculptures by Gutzon Borglum
Sculptures of presidents of the United States
Colossal statues in the United States
Statues of Thomas Jefferson
Unfinished sculptures
National Register of Historic Places in Pennington County, South Dakota